Andrea Pettway Williams (born 1973) is an American artist. She is associated with the Gee's Bend quilting collective, along with her mother, Lorraine Pettway. Her work has been exhibited at the Museum of Fine Arts, Houston, and is included in the collection of the Philadelphia Museum of Art. She is a sixth-generation quilter.

References 

1973 births
Living people
American quilters